The Rosalind Franklin Fellowship (RFF) is an initiation of University of Groningen, the Netherlands. It is named in honor of Rosalind Franklin. 
The purpose of the RFF program is to promote the advancement of talented international researchers at the highest levels of the institution.

History
The program is co-funded by the European Union and primarily directed at female academics, who have a PhD and substantial post-graduation work experience, and who aim for a career towards full professorship at a European top research university. The 5-year fellowship is given to female academics with outstanding track record, including high-quality publications, external funding, and leadership, and provides the fellow with salary and research funds to start a research group and conduct independent research.

In 2009, Queen Máxima  of the Netherlands joined the Fellowship Ceremony.  The RFF program, since its initiation in 2003 and as of 2019, has successfully supported more than 80 female academics, who now constitute more than 10% of the female professors of the university.

Fellows 
 2019–2020  
 Sandy Schmidt, Science and Engineering
 Hannah Dugdale, Science and Engineering
 Julia Kamenz, Science and Engineering
 Inge Holtman, Medical Sciences
 Hilde Bras, Arts
 Sumaya Albalooshi, Economics and Business
 Mònica Colominas Aparicio, Theology and Religious Studies
 Valentina Gallo, Campus Fryslân
 Zoé Christoff, Science and Engineering
 Helle Hansen, Science and Engineering
 Renata Raidou, Science and Engineering
 Kasia Tych, Science and Engineering
 Jagoda Slawinska, Science and Engineering
 Jingxiu Xie, Science and Engineering
 Elisabeth Wilhelm, Science and Engineering
 Lisa Herzog, Philosophy
 Ema Dimastrogiovanni, Science and Engineering
 Cecília Salgado Guimarães da Silva, Science and Engineering
 Annette Bergemann, Economics and Business
 Tessa Quax, Science and Engineering

 2017–2018  
 Alden Waters, Science and Engineering
 Sofia Fernandes Da Silva Ranchordás, Law
 Lingyu Wang, Science and Engineering
 Manuela Vecchi, KVI- Cart  
 Milena Nikolova, Economics and Business  
 Antje Schmitt, Behavioural and Social Sciences
 Jessica de Bloom, Economics and Business
 Başak Bilecen, Behavioural and Social Sciences
 Rieneke Slager, Economics and Business 

 2015–2016
 Su Lam, UMCG (Experimental Cardiology)
 Judith Daniels, Social Sciences (Psychology)
 Janette Burgess, UMCG (Cell Biology)
 Iris Jonkers, UMCG (Genetics)
 Marit Westerterp, UMCG
 Miriam Kunz, UMCG (Geriatrics)
 Judith Paridaen, UMCG (Ageing Biology)
 Lucy Avraamidou, Science and Engineering
 Kerstin Bunte, Science and Engineering
 Julia Even, Science and Engineering
 Pratika Dayal, Science and Engineering (Astronomy)
 Amalia Dolga, Science and Engineering (Molecular Pharmacology)
 Anastasia Borschevsky, Science and Engineering
 Marthe Walvoort, Science and Engineering (Chemical Biology)
 Jing Wan, Economics and Business (Marketing)

 2013–2014
 Dorina Buda (FRW, Tourism)
 Susanne Tauber (FEB, HRM&OB)
 Raquel Ortega Argilés (FEB, GR&M)
 Martine Maan (FSE, CBN)
 Ykelien Boersma (FSE, GRIP)
 Anna Salvati (FSE, GRIP)
 Mónica López López (GMW, Orthopedagogy)
 Stefania Travagnin (GGW, Religious Studies)
 Brigit Toebes (Law, Constitutional Law and International Law)
 Merel Keijzer (Let, Applied Linguistics)
 Romana Schirhagl (UMCG, Biomedical Engineering)
 Sophia Bruggeman (UMCG, Paediatrics)
 Maaike Oosterveer (UMCG, Paediatrics)
 Sonja Pyott (UMCG, ENT)

 2011–2012 
 Karina Isabel Caputi (FSE, Sterrenkunde)
 Angela Casini (FSE, Medicinale Anorganische Chemie)
 Jennifer Jordan (FEB, HRM & OB)
 Jia Liu (FEB, Marketing)
 Alexandra Zhernakova (UMCG, Genetics)
 Pascale Francis Dijkers (UMCG, Cell Biology)
 Kathrin Thedieck (UMCG)
 Maria Colomé Tatché (UMCG)
 Olha Cherednychenko (Law, Private Law)
 Caroline Fournet (Law, Criminal Law)
 Caterina Dutilh Novaes (FWB, Theoretical Philosophy)
 Tamara Witschge (Let, Journalism)
 Lidewijde de Jong (Let, Archeology)
 Joanne van der Woude (Let, English)
 Aleksandra Biegun (KVI, Proton Therapy)

 2009–2010
 Bregje Wertheim (FSE, Biology)
 Anke Terwisscha van Scheltinga (FSE)
 Tamalika Banerjee (FSE, Physics)
 Sabrina Corbellini (LET, Dutch Literature)
 Monika Baár (LET, History)
 Carolina Armenteros (LET, History)
 Dineke Verbeek (UMCG, Neurology)
 Ingrid Nijholt (UMCG, Neuroscience)
 Barbara Bakker (UMCG, Biochemistry)
 Nicoletta Kahya (UMCG, Cellbiology)
 Deniz Başkent (UMCG, Biophysics)
 Barbara Van Leeuwen (UMCG, Chirurgische Oncologie)
 Joke Spikman (UMCG/GMW, Neuropsychologie)
 Jeanne Mifsud Bonnici (Law)
 Hinke Haisma (FRW)
 Mirjam Dür (FSE, Mathematics)
 Sonja Smets (FSE, Artificial Intelligence and FWB, Theoretical Philosophy)

 2007
 Maria Antonietta Loi (FSE, Physics)
 Martina Schmidt (FSE, Pharmacy)
 Irene Tieleman (FSE, Biology)
 Laura Spierdijk (FEB)
 Monika Schmid (LET), Engels
 Marie-Christine Opdenakker (GMW, Educational Science)
 Floor Rink (FEB, Organizational Psychology)
 Ute Bültmann (UMCG, Psychische Gezondheid en arbeidsparticipatie)
 Marianne Rots (UMCG, Pathologie en Laboratoriumgeneeskunde)
 Jetta Bijlsma (UMCG, Medical Microbiology)
 Ellen Nollen (UMCG, Genetics)
 Eriko Takano (FSE, Microbial Physiology)

 2003
 Beatriz Noheda (FSE, Physics)
 Elisabetta Pallante (FSE, Physics)
 Charlotte Hemelrijk (FSE, Biology)

References 

Awards established in 2003
Fellowships
Science awards honoring women
University of Groningen